Vincent Le Quellec (born 8 February 1975 in Lannion) is a French former track cyclist who specialised in the sprint disciplines, twice winning the team sprint world championship as part of the France team in 1997 and 1998.

Major results

External links 

1975 births
Living people
French male cyclists
People from Lannion
UCI Track Cycling World Champions (men)
French track cyclists
Sportspeople from Côtes-d'Armor
Cyclists from Brittany